The 2011 Grand Prix Hassan II was a tennis tournament played on outdoor clay courts. It was the 27th edition of the Grand Prix Hassan II, and an ATP Tour World 250 event on the 2011 ATP World Tour. It took place at the Complexe Al Amal in Casablanca, Morocco, from April 4 through April 10, 2011.

Entrants

Seeds

 Rankings and seedings are as of March 21, 2011.

Other entrants
The following players received wildcards into the main draw:
  Marcos Baghdatis
  Jérémy Chardy
  Reda El Amrani

The following players received entry via qualifying:

  Nicolas Devilder
  Gerard Granollers
  Sergio Gutiérrez-Ferrol
  Andrey Kuznetsov

Champions

Singles

 Pablo Andújar def.  Potito Starace, 6–1, 6–2
It was Andújar's 1st career title.

Doubles

 Robert Lindstedt /  Horia Tecău def.  Colin Fleming /  Igor Zelenay, 6–2, 6–1

External links
 Official website

 
Grand Prix Hassan II
Grand Prix Hassan II